The 24 Caprices for Violin, Op. 22, composed in the early nineteenth century by Pierre Rode, are a series of 24 caprices for solo violin. They cycle through the circle of fifths, presenting each major key and then its relative minor. They were first published in 1813.

Violinists often use these caprices in training to develop technique.

Caprices

Caprice No. 1 in C major 
 Cantabile, 3/4
 Moderato, 12/8

Caprice No. 2 in A minor 
 Allegretto, 6/8

Caprice No. 3 in G major 
 Comodo, 3/4

Caprice No. 4 in E minor 
 Siciliano, 6/8
 Allegro, common time

Caprice No. 5 in D major 
 Moderato, common time

Caprice No. 6 in B minor 
 Adagio, 3/4
 Moderato, cut time

Caprice No. 7 in A major 
 Moderato, common time

Caprice No. 8 in F-sharp minor 
 Moderato assai, 12/8

Caprice No. 9 in E major 
 Adagio, 3/4
 Allegretto, 12/16

Caprice No. 10 in C-sharp minor 
 Allegretto, 3/8

Caprice No. 11 in B major 
 Allegro brillante, common time

Caprice No. 12 in G-sharp minor 
 Comodo, 3/4

Caprice No. 13 in G-flat major 
 Grazioso, common time

Caprice No. 14 in E-flat minor 
 Adagio con espressione, common time
 Appassionato, 3/4

Caprice No. 15 in D-flat major 
 Vivace assai, 3/8

Caprice No. 16 in B-flat minor 
 Andante, 2/4
In the middle of this caprice, the key changes to B-flat major, briefly back to B-flat minor, and then ends in B-flat major.

Caprice No. 17 in A-flat major 
 Vivacissimo, 2/4

Caprice No. 18 in F minor 
 Presto, 3/8

Caprice No. 19 in E-flat major 
 Arioso, 3/4
 Allegretto, 6/8

Caprice No. 20 in C minor 
 Grave e sostenuto, common time

Caprice No. 21 in B-flat major 
 Tempo giusto, 3/4

Caprice No. 22 in G minor 
 Presto, 3/8

Caprice No. 23 in F major 
 Moderato, common time

Caprice No. 24 in D minor 
 Introduzione, 3/4
 Agitato con fuoco, 2/4
This caprice ends in D major.

See also 
 24 Caprices for Solo Violin (Paganini)
 Music written in all major and/or minor keys

References 
Notes

Sources

External links 
 
 
 

Compositions by Pierre Rode
Rode
Rode